D8 motorway is a highway in the Central and North Bohemian region of the Czech Republic. It connects Prague through Ústí nad Labem with the German border at Petrovice and the Bundesautobahn 17 at Bad Gottleuba, leading to Dresden. It forms part of the major European route E55 and the Pan-European Corridor IV.

Segments

From the beginning, the project has been also criticized by some geologists, and lately by the National Financial Audit Office for large cost overrun. In 2013, a major landslide buried part of the under-construction highway. Construction work nevertheless continued and the last part of highway was opened in December 2016 albeit with traffic restrictions between Lovosice and Řehlovice. The restrictions caused by unstable geology; reduced traffic to one lane each on a  section. A solution is to reinforce the section with grout which cost 220 million Kč (8.43 million €). The traffic restrictions between Lovosice and Řehlovice were removed on 20 September 2017 following the stabilization of the roadway.

Images

References

External links 

 Information on dalnice-silnice.cz 
Information on motorway.cz

D08